IAH may refer to:

 George Bush Intercontinental Airport (IATA code), an airport in Houston, Texas, United States
 Iah, a god of the moon in ancient Egyptian religion
 Iah (queen), a king's mother of ancient Egypt during the 11th dynasty
 International Association of Hydrogeologists, a scientific and educational organisation
 Workers International Relief, a Berlin-based organisation whose name in German is Internationale Arbeiter-Hilfe